The Nha Trang Dolphins is a Vietnamese professional basketball team founded in 2020 and based in Nha Trang, Khanh Hoa, Vietnam. They play in the Vietnam Basketball Association.

Season-by-season record

Current roster

Head coach 

  Ryan Marchand (2020)
  Robert Newson (2021)

References

 VBA CHÍNH THỨC CÔNG BỐ ĐỘI BÓNG THỨ 7 CHO MÙA GIẢI 2020
 5 Ý NGHĨA ĐẶC BIỆT TRÊN LOGO CỦA NHA TRANG DOLPHINS CÓ THỂ BẠN CHƯA BIẾT
 VBA có thêm đội bóng thứ 7 Nha Trang Dolphins cho mùa giải 2020

External links 

Basketball teams in Vietnam
Vietnam Basketball Association teams
Basketball teams established in 2020
2020 establishments in Vietnam